The Foundation for Research & Technology – Hellas (FORTH) is a research center in Greece, supervised by the Ministry for Education through its General Secretariat for Research and Technology. It consists of nine research institutes, which are located in various cities of Greece: Heraklion, Rethymno, Patras, Ioannina and Chania. The Foundation’s headquarters, as well as the central administration offices are located in Heraklion, Crete.

Established in 1983, FORTH is today internationally known and one of the largest research organizations in Greece. FORTH's research and technological focus is on areas of scientific, social, and economic interest, such as: astrophysics, computer science, molecular biology, lasers, telecommunications, microelectronics, robotics, biotechnology, materials, medical engineering, applied and computational mathematics, biomedical research, Mediterranean Studies, and historical studies. FORTH also operates Crete University Press, an independent non-profit scientific publishing house.

History
The history of FORTH is directly related with a distinct group of five Greek scientists from abroad, namely Eleftherios Economou, Fotis Kafatos, Dionysios (Dennis) Tsichritzis, Grigoris Sifakis and Peter (Panagiotis) Lambropoulos, who planned the idea and with the help of the Minister of Research and Technology Prof. Georgios Lianis, convinced the Greek Government to create  in 1983 the Research Center of Crete (RCC)  in Heraklion and its first three Institutes: the Institute of Electronic Structure and Laser (IESL),  the Institute of Molecular Biology & Biotechnology (IMBB) and the Institute of Computer Science (ICS).  Having Prof. Economou as its first Director General, RCC rapidly expanded with an Institute of Mediterranean Studies (IMS) in Rethymon and Institute of Applied Computational Mathematics in Heraklion. In 1986 Skinakas Observatory, jointly supported by RCC, the University of Crete and the Max Planck Institute for Extraterrestrial Physics (Germany)  also commenced its operations. In 1987 with the agreement of Prof. George Papatheodorou and Prof. Iacovos Vasalos who were respectively the Directors of the Institute of Chemical Engineering & High Temperature Processes - (ICE/HT) in Patras and the  Chemical Process Engineering Research Institute (CPERI) in Thessaloniki, the two institutes joined RCC thus creating FORTH. In 2002 the Biomedical Research Institute (BRI), based in Ioannina is incorporated into FORTH. In parallel, with financial support from the European Union, the construction of the FORTH buildings in Heraklion, Patras, Thessaloniki, and the restoration of the IMS building in Rethymno began. With the initiative and cooperation of FORTH with the General Secretariat for Research and Technology, Science and Technology Parks were established connected to the Institutes in Heraklion, Patras, and Thessaloniki and respective buildings with European funding were erected. The main FORTH building infrastructure in Heraklion in 2004 had an area of 30,000 square meters. Most of the buildings were designed and supervised by Panos Koulermos, then a professor of architecture at the University of Southern California. In 2018, the Institute of Astrophysics and the Institute of Petroleum Research were also founded as part of FORTH, while in 2022 the Hellenic Institute of Human Genomics was created in Athens. Over the years, FORTH has been established as the premier research organisation in Greece, ranking consistently first in scientific quality and international recognition by a variety of metrics, including evaluations by external Committees as well as attracting funding by European Research Council grants.

Institutes
FORTH currently consists of the following research institutes:
 Institute of Applied and Computational Mathematics - IACM
Institute of Astrophysics - IA
 Institute of Chemical Engineering & High Temperature Processes - ICE/HT
 Institute of Computer Science - ICS
 Institute of Electronic Structure and Laser - IESL
 Institute of Mediterranean Studies - IMS
 Institute of Molecular Biology & Biotechnology - IMBB
 Biomedical Research Institute - BRI
 Institute of Geoenergy - IG
 Hellenic Institute of Human Genomics

From 1987 to 2000, the Chemical Process Engineering Research Institute (CPERI)
based in Thessaloniki was also part of FORTH. In 2000, CPERI was separated from FORTH to become a
founding member of a new research center, the National Centre for Research and Technology-Hellas (CERTH).

Directors 
The position of the Director of FORTH and Chairperson of the Governing Council was held by the following individuals:

Eleftherios N. Economou, 1983-2004
 Stelios Orphanoudakis, 2004-2005
 Alkiviades C. Payatakes, 2005-2009
 Vassilios A. Dougalis, 2010-2011 (Acting Director)
 Costas Fotakis, 2011-2016
 Nektarios Tavernarakis, 2016–present

References

External links
 FORTH web site

Science and technology in Greece
Research institutes in Greece
1983 establishments in Greece
Heraklion